Sarah Miriam Schulman (born July 28, 1958) is an American novelist, playwright, nonfiction writer, screenwriter, gay activist, and AIDS historian. She is a Distinguished Professor of the Humanities at College of Staten Island (CSI) and a Fellow at the New York Institute for the Humanities. She is a recipient of the Bill Whitehead Award and the Lambda Literary Award.

Early life and education
Schulman was born on July 28, 1958 in New York City. She attended Hunter College High School, and attended the University of Chicago from 1976 to 1978 but did not graduate. She has a Bachelor of Arts degree from Empire State College in Saratoga Springs, New York.

Literary career
Schulman published her first novel, The Sophie Horowitz Story, in 1984, which was followed by Girls, Visions and Everything in 1986 — which is considered important among lesbian subcultures.

Schulman's third novel, After Delores, received a positive review in The New York Times, was translated into eight languages, and was awarded an American Library Association Stonewall Book Award in 1989. Empathy, a highly experimental work, appeared in 1992. Her novel Rat Bohemia (1995) received a full-page rave review in The New York Times from Edmund White, and was named one of the 100 best LGBT books by The Publishing Triangle.

Subsequent novels included Shimmer, The Child, and The Mere Future. The Cosmopolitans was named one of the best American novels of 2016 by Publishers Weekly. In 2018, she published Maggie Terry, a return to and comment on the lesbian detective novel, addressing the emotions of life under President Donald Trump.

Stagestruck: Theater, AIDS, and the Marketing of Gay America (1998), which won the Stonewall Book Award, argues that significant plot elements of the successful 1996 musical Rent were lifted from her 1990 novel, People in Trouble. The heterosexual plot of Rent is based on the opera La Bohème, while the gay plot is similar to the plot of Schulman's novel. Schulman never sued, but analyzed in Stagestruck the way the musical depicted AIDS and gay people, in contrast to work made by those communities that same year.

In 2009, The New Press published Ties That Bind: Familial Homophobia and Its Consequences, which was nominated for a Lambda Literary Award. In September 2013, The Gentrification of the Mind: Witness to a Lost Imagination, was published by the University of California Press. Slate called The Gentrification of the Mind one of the 10 "Best Most Unknown Books" and GalleyCat called it one of the "Best Unrecognized Books" of the year. It was also nominated for a Lambda Literary Award. Israel/Palestine and the Queer International was published by Duke University Press in 2012, and was nominated for a Lambda Literary Award. Her 2016 book Conflict Is Not Abuse: Overstating Harm, Community Responsibility and the Duty of Repair was published by Arsenal Pulp Press, was nominated for a Lambda Literary Award, won a Judy Grahn Award by the Publishing Triangle, and was widely discussed and read.

Schulman was named one of Publishers Weeklys 60 Most Underrated Writers.

In 2018, the second edition of her 1994 collection My American History: Lesbian and Gay Life During the Reagan/Bush Years was issued including new material by Urvashi Vaid, Stephen Thrasher, and Alison Bechdel.

Let the Record Show: A Political History of the AIDS Coalition to Unleash Power New York (ACT UP, New York 1987–1993) was published by Farrar, Straus, and Giroux in 2021, and was a finalist for both the 2019 and 2020 J. Anthony Lukas Book Prize for Works-In-Progress and for the 2022 PEN/John Kenneth Galbraith Award for Nonfiction. It won a special award from the Publishing Triangle, won the Lambda Literary Award for LGBTQ Nonfiction, and was awarded a prize by The National Organization of LGBT Journalists. It was a New York Times Notable Book of 2021. Cleveland Review of Books said it combines "acute political and social analysis with in-depth portraits of human beings."

Activism
Schulman's activism began in her childhood when she protested the Vietnam War with her mother. Later, Schulman was active in the Women's Union while being a student at the University of Chicago from 1976 to 1978. From 1979 to 1982, Schulman was a member of The  for Abortion Rights and Against Sterilization Abuse (CARASA) and participated in an early direct action protest in which she and five others (called The Women's Liberation Zap Action Brigade) disrupted an anti-abortion hearing in Congress. She was an active member of ACT UP, the AIDS Coalition to Unleash Power from 1987 to 1992, attending actions at the FDA, NIH, Stop the Church, and was arrested when ACT UP occupied Grand Central Station protesting the First Gulf War.

In 1987, Schulman and filmmaker Jim Hubbard co-founded the New York Lesbian and Gay Experimental Film Festival, now called MIX NYC and is currently in its thirty-third year.

In 1992, Schulman and five other women co-founded the Lesbian Avengers, a direct action organization. On her 1992 book tour for Empathy, Schulman visited gay bookstores in the South to start chapters. The organization's high points included founding the first Dyke March during the March on Washington for Lesbian, Gay and Bi Equal Rights and Liberation, and sending groups of young organizers to Maine and Idaho to assist local fights against anti-gay ballot initiatives.

Since 2001, Schulman and Jim Hubbard have been creating the ACT UP Oral History Project, interviewing 188 surviving members of ACT UP over 18 years. They produced a feature documentary, United in Anger: A History of ACT UP, which premiered at the Museum of Modern Art Gallery in the fall of 2010. Harvard purchased the archive for their collection, while maintaining free access, and the funds were used to produce United in Anger.

In 2009, Schulman declined an invitation to Tel Aviv University in support of Palestine and the Boycott, Divestment and Sanctions. She is on the advisory board of Jewish Voice for Peace and is faculty advisor to Students for Justice in Palestine at the College of Staten Island. She is also on the board of RAIA (Researching the American/Israeli Alliance). In 2011, she published an Op-ed in The New York Times on Pinkwashing, a term coined earlier by Ali Abunimah to describe how the Israeli government uses LGBT rights in its public relations.

While employed as a university professor Schulman continued to teach and mentor writers through a number of community based initiatives including the Lambda Literary Foundation, Queer Artists Mentorship, An independent workshop for trans women writers sponsored by Topside Press, The Fine Arts Work Center in Provincetown and a number of workshops run out of her apartment before the onset of Covid. She curates First Mondays at Performance Space New York: Free Readings Of New Works In Progress, held on the first Monday of each month.

In 2017, she joined the advisory board of Claudia Rankine's Racial Imaginary Institute.

Theater
From 1979 to 1994, she had 15 plays produced in the context of the avant-garde "Downtown Arts Movement" based in New York City's East Village. Venues included The University of the Streets, P.S. 122, La Mama, King Tut Wah-Wah Hut, the Pyramid Club, 8BC, Franklin Furnace, The Kitchen, Ela Troyano and Uzi Parness' Club Chandelier, Here, the Performing Garage, and others. Schulman was admitted into the Sundance Theater Lab in 2001 with the play Carson McCullers, based on the life of the 20th century writer. The workshop starred Angelina Phillips and Bill Camp and was directed by Craig Lucas. The play had its world premiere at Playwrights Horizons in 2002, directed by Marion McClinton and starring Jenny Bacon. Carson McCullers has been published by Playscripts Inc. This was followed by a commission from South Coast Repertory for which she wrote two plays: Made in Korea, based on the memoirs of Mi Ok Bruining, and Mercy. Both plays were presented in several readings and workshops.

In 2005, Tim Sanford, artistic director of Playwrights Horizons, produced Manic Flight Reaction. Director Trip Cullman developed the work at New York Stage and Film, and it opened at Playwrights that winter, starring Deirdre O'Connell with Molly Price, Jessica Collins, Austin Lysy, Michael Esper, and Angel Desai.

Schulman secured the rights to write an adaptation of Isaac Bashevis Singer's Enemies, A Love Story, which premiered at the Wilma Theater in Philadelphia in 2007, directed by Jiri Ziska. It later had a New York reading at the New York Theatre Workshop, directed by Jo Bonney.

In 2018, her play Between Covers was included in the New Stages Festival at the Goodman Theatre in Chicago, her play Roe Versus Wade had a reading at the New York Theatre Workshop and she was commissioned by BMG and The Manchester Factory to write the book for The Snow Queen, a theatrical work highlighting the music of Marianne Faithfull.

In the summer of 2022 her play THE LADY HAMLET had its world premiere at The Provincetown Theater directed by David Drake and opened to universally ecstatic reviews. The cast was: Jennifer Van Dyck, Kate Levy, Anne Stott, Laura Scribner, Jon Shuman, Peter Toto.

Film
In fall 2009, Schulman and Cheryl Dunye wrote the screenplay for Dunye's film The Owls, starring Guinevere Turner, Lisa Gornick, Cheryl Dunye, and V.S. Brodie. The film had its world premiere at the 60th Berlin International Film Festival in January 2010. She and Dunye then wrote an X-rated film Mommy Is Coming, which was produced in Germany by Jürgen Brüning and selected for the 2012 Berlin International Film Festival.

She is co-producer with Jim Hubbard of his feature-length documentary United in Anger: A History of ACT UP which premiered at the Museum of Modern Art on the opening night of Documentary Fortnight on February 16, 2012. The film's international premiere was in Ramallah, Palestine. It won Best Documentary at both MIX Milan and ReelQ in Pittsburgh.

Schulman played filmmaker Shirley Clarke to Jack Waters' Jason Holliday in Stephen Winter's response to Clarke's 1967 documentary Portrait of Jason, Jason and Shirley, which premiered at BAMcinemaFest in June 2015 and played for a week at the Museum of Modern Art in October 2015.

Published works

Novels
Maggie Terry (2018)
The Cosmopolitans (2016)
The Mere Future (2009)
The Child (2007)
Shimmer (1998)
Collected Early Novels of Sarah Schulman (1998)
Rat Bohemia (1995) – translated into Portuguese (Boêmia dos Ratos)
Empathy (1992)
People in Trouble (1990)
After Delores (1988)
Girls, Visions and Everything (1986)
The Sophie Horowitz Story (1984)

Nonfiction
 Let the Record Show: A Political History of ACT UP New York, 1987–1993 (2021) (Farrar, Straus, Giroux)
 Conflict Is Not Abuse: Overstating Harm, Community Responsibility and the Duty of Repair (2016)
 Israel/Palestine and the Queer International (2012)
 The Gentrification of the Mind: Witness to a Lost Imagination (2012)
 Ties That Bind: Familial Homophobia and Its Consequences (2009)
 Stagestruck: Theater, AIDS, and the Marketing of Gay America (1998)
 My American History: Lesbian and Gay Life During the Reagan/Bush Years (1994), second edition (2018)

Plays
Published:
Mercy (2009) (published in a shared volume with Robert Glück by Belladonna)
Carson McCullers (2003) (published by Playscripts Inc., 2006)
 Produced:
 Enemies, A Love Story (adapted from Isaac Bashevis Singer) (Wilma Theater, 2007)
 Carson McCullers (Playwrights Horizons, 2005)
Manic Flight Reaction (Playwrights Horizons, 2005)
 "The Lady Hamlet" (Provincetown Theater, 2022)

Films
Jason and Shirley (directed by Steven Winter, 2015)
 United in Anger: A History of ACT UP (co-producer, directed by Jim Hubbard, 2012)
Mommy Is Coming (directed by Cheryl Dunye, 2011)
The Owls (directed by Cheryl Dunye, 2009)

Honors and awards
Guggenheim Fellowship in Playwrighting, 2001
Fulbright for Judaic Studies
2 New York Foundation for the Arts Fellowships in Fiction
New York Foundation for the Arts Fellowship in Playwriting
Kessler Prize for Sustained Contribution to LGBT Studies from CLAGS: The Center for LGBTQ Studies
Revson Fellowship
Fellow at the New York Institute for the Humanities, New York University
9 residencies at the MacDowell Colony
5 residencies at Yaddo
Two-time honoree for the American Library Association Stonewall Book Awards
Brown Foundation/Houston Arts Museum Fellowship at the Dora Maar House in Ménerbes
Fellowship at The Mark S. Bonham Centre for Sexual Diversity Studies
2 Publishing Triangle Awards (Fiction and Nonfiction)
2018 Bill Whitehead Award for Lifetime Achievement
2022 The Ann Snitow Prize
2022 PEN/John Kenneth Galbraith Award for Nonfiction, Finalist, for Let the Record Show

See also
 LGBT culture in New York City
 List of LGBT people from New York City

References

Further reading

External links

 Gentrification of The Mind on WNYC
 Faculty profile at College of Staten Island, CUNY 
ACT UP Oral History Project

1958 births
20th-century American novelists
21st-century American novelists
American women novelists
Living people
American lesbian writers
Jewish American artists
Jewish American writers
Jewish feminists
Members of ACT UP
Writers from New York City
American LGBT dramatists and playwrights
American LGBT novelists
20th-century American women writers
21st-century American women writers
American women dramatists and playwrights
LGBT people from New York (state)
20th-century American dramatists and playwrights
21st-century American dramatists and playwrights
Hunter College High School alumni
Empire State College alumni
College of Staten Island faculty
Novelists from New York (state)
Lesbian Avengers members
Lesbian academics
Palestinian solidarity activists
Stonewall Book Award winners
21st-century American Jews